The Untold is a 2002 Canadian adventure horror film independently produced in Canada written and directed by Jonas Quastel. The film is known under several different titles depending on the date and location of its release, with it being known as Sasquatch for English versions such as the Canadian DVD release (with the French Canadian title being known as Inexplicable) and airings on the SyFy Channel along with being known as Sasquatch: la créature de la forêt in France. It was first released in France in May 2002. It was released on March 11, 2003 in Canada and the United States. It was panned by critics, with the writing, pacing, Quastel's directing and performances receiving most of the criticisms.

Plot
Tara Knowles, a researcher for Bio-Comp, and a small crew are flying over the Canadian wilderness when their plane malfunctions. They survive the crash but encounter a monster that seemingly kills them all. Weeks pass and with official rescue missions called off, Tara's father, Harlan Knowles, puts together his own crew: his computer engineer Plazz, insurance representative Marla Lawson, famous survivalist Winston Burg, forensic investigator Nikki Adams, and local mountain man Clayton Tyne. After arriving in the suspected crash zone, they hear loud roars in the forest. On their first night, Marla is attacked in her tent by what Clayton determines was a grizzly bear. The next day, they come across the deceased bear and discover its neck was broken by a nearby boulder.

As the sun sets, it begins to thunderstorm and the group takes refuge in a cave, where Plazz finds cave art. Nikki determines that it is blood of some kind and only a few months old. Harlan finds a shell near the cave's entrance, a piece of Tara's necklace. They search the area but find nothing else. After another full day of searching, they set up camp near a natural hot spring. Marla talks with Harlan at the spring away from the others, revealing she knows about the project Tara had been working on and that without the prototype Tara had with her, his company is practically bankrupt. She blackmails him into keeping it quiet in return for $30 million in Bio-Comp stock. Around the fire, Clayton confronts Burg about the claims he's made in his survivalist books, having noticed his many flaws as they have been tracking and Burg threatens him.

The following day, the group locates the crash site but finds it empty, save for a piece of the fuselage. Clayton finds evidence of something large being dragged through the forest. They follow the tracks and eventually uncover the wreckage of the plane, hidden under some thick foliage. The only evidence of the crew is a severed arm, still holding on to a pistol. Burg finds "Huxley" nearby, the prototype machine Tara had with her. The machine is able to instantly analyze the genetic history and makeup of any organic material on Earth. Plazz powers on Huxley and finds it was used on some blood shortly after the crash. The machine determined the blood analyzed was scientific proof of Sasquatch.

That night, Burg gets excessively drunk and he starts randomly shooting into the forest after he hears a noise, narrowly missing others sitting around the fire. He hits a creature in the woods, which lets out a roar. Harlan fires Burg and promotes Clayton as their head guide, infuriating Burg. He attacks Clayton but is heavily inebriated and gives up; the others leaving him alone at the campfire. Burg cries out as the Sasquatch grabs him. Harlan reviews tapes found in the fuselage and it is revealed the blood was taken from the outside of the plane, meaning a Sasquatch was likely killed upon the plane's crash landing, angering its family and causing it to kill Tara's crew in revenge. Clayton investigates Burg's cry and searches the nearby forest, finding a massive den in the underbrush with Burg's body stuffed inside and several other decomposing bodies, including Tara's.

As they bury the bodies in shallow graves, the Sasquatch watches them. Marla steals Huxley but a Sasquatch attacks and kills her. The others find her brutalized body and Harlan takes Huxley as they all try to make their escape. Clayton and the others realize the creature's intelligence and try to convince Harlan to leave the machine behind, saying the Sasquatch knows it proves its existence, something it does not want. Harlan splits from the others, unwilling to leave Huxley and the creature starts tracking him. The Sasquatch attacks him, knocking him unconscious. He awakens next to the grave of the Sasquatch's mate, which was killed by the plane. He and the Sasquatch have a final confrontation and Harlan shoots Huxley and the Sasquatch leaves. The film ends with a title card explaining Clayton, Nikki, and Harlan all denied Plazz’s claims of a Sasquatch encounter upon returning to society, who was deemed psychologically unwell he got taken by seattle.

Cast
 Lance Henriksen as Harlan Knowles - President & CEO of Bio-Comp Technologies; searching for his missing daughter and some lost research equipment
 Andrea Roth as Marla Lawson - of Browning & Burrows Underwriters, NY; funding the search believing it would be cheaper to find the lost equipment than paying the insurance coverage
 Russel Ferrier as Clayton Tyne - "Mountain man", the search's guide and tracker
 Philip Granger as Winston Burg - Author of In the Company of Lions and other survivalist books
 Jeremy Radick as Plazz - Bio-Comp computer engineer 
 Mary Mancini as Nikki Adams - Forensic investigator and crash analyst
 Taras Kostyuk as Sasquatch the creature monster vengeful kill people
 Erica Parker as Tara Knowles - Harlan's daughter, goes missing along with the rest of her crew in the Canadian wilderness

Release
The film was released in theaters and on DVD on March 11, 2003. Lionsgate later released the film on DVD on June 4, 2014.

Reception
Critical reception for the film has been mostly negative. Patrick Naugle from DVD Verdict gave the film a negative review calling the film "a paper-thin idea stretched into a feature length film".
Scott Weinberg from eFilmCritic.com awarded the film 1 star out of 4 criticizing the film's lack of logic and the absence of the title monster through most of the film.
Digital Retribution.com panned the film stating, "Granted, some of the stuff looks cool, but because so much fails, the film just comes off as DESPERATELY trying to be stylized". The site also criticized Quastel's lack of point and originality.
Nearly a decade after the film was released on DVD, it was critiqued in a review by MTV.com in a segment called "Eric's Bad Movies", implying the opinion of the review. Most of the review is an analysis of the film's plot and the actors' performances are criticized in a tongue-in-cheek manner that argues the film is both uninspired and "tediously generic".

References

External links
 
 The Untold 2002. Columbia TriStar, Curb Entertainment by Larry Seymour
 THE UNTOLD: Sasquatch Encounter to be Shown to the World. Business Wire, Monday, March 26, 2001
 

2002 films
Canadian horror films
English-language Canadian films
Horror films based on actual events
2002 horror films
Bigfoot films
2000s English-language films
2000s Canadian films
Sony Pictures direct-to-video films